Paul Brotherton (born 11 July 1966) is a British sailor. He competed in the men's 470 event at the 1992 Summer Olympics.

References

External links
 

1966 births
Living people
British male sailors (sport)
Olympic sailors of Great Britain
Sailors at the 1992 Summer Olympics – 470
Sportspeople from Oldham